A submarine pen (U-Boot-Bunker in German) is a type of submarine base that acts as a bunker to protect submarines from air attack.

The term is generally applied to submarine bases constructed during World War II, particularly in Germany and its occupied countries, which were also known as U-boat pens (after the phrase "U-boat" to refer to German submarines).

Background
Among the first forms of protection for submarines were some open-sided shelters with partial wooden foundations that were constructed during World War I. These structures were built at the time when bombs were light enough to be dropped by hand from the cockpit. By the 1940s, the quality of aerial weapons and the means to deliver them had improved markedly.

The mid-1930s saw the Naval Construction Office in Berlin give the problem serious thought. Various factions in the navy were convinced protection for the expanding U-boat arm was required. A Royal Air Force (RAF) raid on the capital in 1940, the occupation of France and Britain's refusal to surrender triggered a massive building programme of submarine pens and air raid shelters.

By the autumn of 1940, construction of  the "Elbe II" bunker in Hamburg and "Nordsee III" on the island of Heligoland was under way. Others swiftly followed.

General
It was soon realised that such a massive project was beyond the Kriegsmarine, and the Todt Organisation (OT) was brought in to oversee the administration of labour. The local supply of such items as sand, aggregate, cement, and timber was often a cause for concern. The steel required was mostly imported from Germany. The attitudes of the people in France and Norway were significantly different. In France there was generally no problem with the recruitment of men and the procurement of machinery and raw materials. It was a different story in Norway. There, the local population were far more reluctant to help the Germans. Indeed, most labour had to be brought in. The ground selected for bunker construction was no help either: usually being at the head of a fjord, the foundations and footings had to be hewn out of granite. Several metres of silt also had to be overcome. Many of the workers needed were forced labour, most especially the concentration camp inmates supplied by the Schutzstaffel from camps near the pens.

The incessant air raids caused serious disruption to the project, hampering the supply of material, destroying machinery, and harassing the workers. Machinery such as excavators, pile drivers, cranes, floodlighting, and concrete pumps (which were still a relatively new technology in the 1940s) was temperamental, and in the case of steam-driven equipment, very noisy.

Bunkers had to be able to accommodate more than just U-boats; space had to be found for offices, medical facilities, communications, lavatories, generators, ventilators, anti-aircraft guns, accommodation for key personnel such as crewmen, workshops, water purification plants, electrical equipment, and radio testing facilities. Storage space for spares, explosives, ammunition, and oil was also required.

Types of bunker
Four types of bunker were constructed:
 Covered lock
 These were bunkers built over an existing lock to give a U-boat some protection while it was at its most vulnerable – i.e. when the lock was emptying or filling. They were usually constructed with new locks alongside an existing structure.
 Construction bunker
 Used for building new boats
 Fitting-out bunkers
 After launch, many U-boats were fitted-out under their protection
 Shelter for operational boats and repair bunkers
 This was the most numerous type. There were two types that were built either on dry land or over the water. The former meant that U-boats had to be moved on ramps; the latter enabled the boats to come and go at will. Pumping the water out enabled dry dock repairs to be carried out. Some bunkers were large enough to allow the removal of periscopes and aerials.

There is no truth in the rumour of an underground bunker on Fuerteventura in the Canary Islands. This story was gleaned from a similar situation in Le Havre in France when captured U-boat men were interrogated by the British.

Locations
Pens were constructed in the northern coastal ports of the Reich and in many occupied countries.

Germany
Pens protecting construction of the Type XXI submarine were located in Hamburg (Blohm & Voss), Bremen (AG Weser), and Danzig (F. Schichau).

Bremen

The "Hornisse" bunker was not started until 1944 in Bremen; it was never completed.

"Valentin" was the largest bunker in Germany. Begun in 1943, it was built to be a manufacturing facility, where Type XXI submarines were to be constructed. It too was never completed. Post-war, it was briefly used as a test site for British and American bombs (most of the damage done to the bunker was inflicted at this time) before becoming a storage facility for the German Navy. The labour to construct it was supplied by local concentration camps such as Neuengamme in Hamburg.
Valentin: 
Hornisse:

Hamburg
The city was the site of two structures, "Elbe II" and "Fink II". The Finkenwerder bunker was constructed by 1,700 slave labourers over four years. After capture, it was demolished with 32 tonnes of bombs.
Elbe II: 
Fink II:

Helgoland
The "Nordsee III" bunker in Helgoland was one of the oldest submarine pens, being started in 1940. It was left alone until near the end of the war when it was attacked by the RAF and like most of the facilities on the island, completely destroyed. It was also used after the end of the war for testing new weapons. No trace of the pen has survived.

Kiel
This town was constantly bombed in World War II, the targets often being the "Kilian" and "Konrad" bunkers. They were started in 1941 and 1942 respectively. The latter was used for the construction of Seehund midget submarines.

It was in "Kilian" that  was probably the only submarine to be lost in a bunker. Misguided bombs from an air raid on the town caused what might today be called a tsunami to cross the Förde and enter the bunker. "This simple precaution saved U-170 from sinking while lying next to U-4708".

Wilhelmshaven
A U-boat bunker in Wilhelmshaven was planned, but it never got beyond the preliminary stage.

France
The German occupying forces built many U-boat pens in the Atlantic ports of France in Bordeaux, Brest, La Rochelle/La Pallice, Lorient, and St. Nazaire. Almost 4.4 million cubic metres of concrete were used.

Bordeaux
An unnamed bunker and bunkered lock were constructed in Bordeaux, the fourth largest French city at the start of the war. Both structures were started in 1941; the bunkered lock was not finished by war's end. The main building was larger than those in other locations; this was to allow supply boats and minelayers to use it. The Royal Italian Navy established the Betasom base at Bordeaux. The port was also the target of a British commando raid – the so-called Cockleshell Heroes.

Brest

The Brittany port only had one bunker, but it was the largest; it was also unnamed. Started in 1941, the plans were modified many times before completion a year later.

By February 1942 the RAF had lost interest in the area; most of the town had already been destroyed and they did not possess large enough bombs to seriously threaten the bunker. Between February 1942 and early 1943, apart from a few American aircraft, the place was left alone. The German garrison surrendered to US forces in September 1944. They had had sufficient explosives to cripple the bunker but did not use them due to the proximity of a hospital.

La Rochelle/La Pallice

Only  separate La Rochelle and La Pallice so they are usually considered as one port. An unnamed bunker was built at La Pallice; it was started in April 1941. Similar building techniques to those used in St. Nazaire were employed. Due to the relative ease of construction, the main structure was ready for its first U-boats six months later. A bunkered lock was begun in June 1942. It was completed in March 1944. Scenes for the 1981 films Das Boot and Raiders of the Lost Ark were shot in La Pallice.

Lorient

The largest U-boat base was the Lorient Submarine Base in Brittany. Three bunkers, "Keroman I", "II" and "III", the "Scorff" bunker and two "Dom" bunkers, east and west, were all begun in 1941. Two more were in the planning stage.

"Keroman I" was unique in that it required its U-boats to be "hauled out of the water, placed on a many-wheeled buggy and then transported into the bunker on a sliding bridge system." This arrangement might have been more vulnerable to air raids, but damage was minimal and it had the advantage of the U-boat not needing a dry dock. "Keroman II", being landlocked, was served by the same system.
Keroman I:  
Keroman II:  

"Keroman III" was more conventional, as was the "Scorff" bunker. The two "Dom" bunkers (so-called because of their resemblance to the religious building, Dom means 'cathedral' in German) were located around a massive turntable which fed U-boats into the covered repair bays.
 Keroman III:  
 Scorff:  
Dom (East):  
 Dom (West):  

Karl Dönitz, head of the U-boat arm and later the chief of the Kriegsmarine, had his headquarters at nearby Kernevel.

St-Nazaire

The construction of the Saint-Nazaire submarine base was commenced in 1941, including a bunkered lock. (Elsewhere in the reference, it states that "the excavations" for the bunkered lock were begun in October 1942).

The pens were not affected by the British commando raid in March 1942, whose main objective were the Normandie dock gates.

Norway

Norway is to some extent ruled by its weather. Building submarine pens was often hampered by snow and ice; the ground might have been chosen, but the occupation of France only a few months after Norway's surrender rather overshadowed the Scandinavian country as far as bunkers for U-boats was concerned. Nonetheless, a requirement for protection was identified. With the liberation of France in 1944, Norway regained its importance, but for barely a year.

The Norwegian bunkers in Bergen and Trondheim were originally designed to have two floors, the lower one for U-boats, the upper one for accommodation, workshops and offices. However, with the project running six months late, plans for the second storey were abandoned.

Bergen
Control of the Bergen project came under the German Naval Dockyard. Construction of "Bruno" commenced in 1941, with a Munich-based firm taking the lead. A shortage of labour, along with the acquisition of raw materials in sufficient quantities and poor weather, was always going to cause problems. Specialised machinery had to be imported, as did accommodation that could stand up to the harsh Norwegian winter.

In a bid to increase its protection, the bunker had granite blocks, each about a cubic metre in size, positioned on its roof. The shortage of cement ensured that the blocks could not be properly stuck down.

Trondheim
"Dora I" was started in 1941, shortly after Operation Barbarossa, the invasion of the Soviet Union. It was constructed by Soviet prisoners of war. It did not seem to bother the submariners as much as the builders. Work on "Dora II" started in 1942, but it was not completed by the end of the war.

The Allied bombing offensive

U-boat facilities first became a bombing priority in March 1941  and again during the Combined Bomber Offensive. The bunkers did not suffer as much as their surroundings until August 1944 when a new type of bomb was used against them, the "Tallboy" bomb.

U-boat yards and pens were the primary objectives for the US Eighth Air Force from late 1942 to early 1943. In the course of the war, the Allies used various tactics and weaponry against German U-boat pens. For example, The United States Army Air Forces, as part of Operation Aphrodite, used US designed and operated radio-controlled aircraft, "Bat" guided bombs. Whereas the RAF Bomber Command, used the Royal Navy designed "Disney" rocket-assisted bombs, and the Barnes Wallis devised Tallboy and Grand Slam deep penetration bombs.

A U-boat pen concrete target had been built at Ashley Walk bombing range in the New Forest, Hampshire, to assist in preparation for these raids.  It consisted of a concrete roof covering three shallow "pens".  After the war it was buried in an earth mound, although its edges are once again visible in places due to weathering.

Post war

Yugoslavia 
The Yugoslav People's Army used submarine pens as well, including ones on the islands of Vis and Brač or in Kotor Bay, carved inside natural hills. The ones in Montenegro fulfilled their purpose, housing and protecting the submarines and missile boats from NATO aerial attacks during Operation Allied Force in 1999. They are now abandoned and freely accessible from sea or by foot.

See also 
 Muskö naval base (Sweden)
 Naval museum complex Balaklava (includes several cold war era submarine pens)
 Yulin Naval Base (China)

Notes

Bibliography

External links

 German World War II U-boat pens in France 

Bunkers

World War II strategic bombing